The Fonta Flora State Trail is a unit of the North Carolina state park system in Buncombe, McDowell,  and Burke Counties, North Carolina in the United States, and it consists of  of conservation land and  designated multi-use trail.  The State Trail is planned as a continuous route for hikers and cyclists from Asheville to Morganton, with a loop around Lake James.  The trail is a collaboration between local governments, local land conservancies the US Forest Service, and the state, with development coordinated by the North Carolina Division of Parks and Recreation (NCDPR).

History
In 2004, Duke Energy's Crescent Resources made a deal with NCDPR to sell undeveloped land around Lake James for an expansion of Lake James State Park, and they offered trail easements for the Overmountain Victory National Historic Trail on their properties.  Two years later, Duke Energy started the process of re-licensing their hydroelectric dams on Lake James with the Federal Energy Regulatory Commission.  Public comments during the re-licensing encouraged Duke Energy to develop a loop trail around Lake James, which would connect all communities, recreational, commercial and residential properties, the Overmountain Victory Trail, and local/state parks along the lake.

The loop trail concept was initially called the Lake James Loop Trail, but it was later renamed after the community of Fonta Flora, which was submerged with the creation of Lake James.

On June 15, 2015, the General Assembly of North Carolina established the Fonta Flora State Trail, and directed NCDPR to coordinate its development.

During the master planning process for the state trail, its concept was expanded with connections from Lake James to Asheville and Morganton.

On April 17, 2018, the Foothills Conservancy donated  of undeveloped land near Old Fort to NCDPR for the trail.  The conservancy also obtained trail easements from adjoining property owners for future construction of the trail.  The property follows a ridge near Camp Grier, and the Foothills Conservancy will manage it on NCDPR's behalf.

List of designated sections
NCDPR has designated several existing trails as part of the Fonta Flora Trail (from west to east):
Oaks Trail in Black Mountain
Point Lookout Trail in Pisgah National Forest
Fonta Flora State Trail at Greenlee Park in McDowell County
Joseph McDowell Historical Catawba Greenway in Marion
Fonta Flora County Park in Burke County
Catawba River Greenway in Morganton

References

External links
 
 Burke County webpage on the Fonta Flora Trail
 Fonta Flora State Trail Master Plan
 Fonta Flora Trail maps
 Session Law 2015-113 established Fonta Flora State Trail.

State parks of North Carolina
Protected areas of Buncombe County, North Carolina
Protected areas of Burke County, North Carolina
Protected areas of McDowell County, North Carolina
Protected areas established in 2015
2015 establishments in North Carolina
Hiking trails in North Carolina